Livingstone Primary School may refer to:

Livingstone Primary School, Melbourne, a primary school in Melbourne, Australia
Livingstone Primary School, Livingstone, a primary school in Livingstone, Zambia